Timor Avitan (born 27 November 1991) is an Israeli professional association football player who plays for Ironi Tiberias.

Biography

Playing career 
Avitan was born in Dimona and moved to Ashdod, when he was 11 years old. Avitan made his league debut in a Premier League match against Maccabi Tel Aviv on 30 May 2009 when he replaced Idan Sade in the 46th minute.

International career 
Avitan represented Israel at the 2009 Maccabiah Games, winning a bronze medal.

Footnotes

References 
 

1991 births
Living people
Israeli footballers
Israeli Mizrahi Jews
F.C. Ashdod players
Hapoel Ashkelon F.C. players
Maccabi Yavne F.C. players
Maccabi Kiryat Gat F.C. players
Hapoel Kfar Shalem F.C. players
Hapoel Marmorek F.C. players
Footballers from Dimona
Hapoel Ironi Baqa al-Gharbiyye F.C. players
Ironi Nesher F.C. players
Hapoel Umm al-Fahm F.C. players
Maccabi Herzliya F.C. players
Hapoel Iksal F.C. players
Ironi Tiberias F.C. players
Israeli Premier League players
Liga Leumit players
Footballers from Ashdod
Israeli people of Moroccan-Jewish descent
Maccabiah Games medalists in football
Maccabiah Games bronze medalists for Israel
Competitors at the 2009 Maccabiah Games
Association football forwards